The Endicott Mountains are a range of mountains, part of the Brooks Range in northern Alaska. To the east are the Philip Smith Mountains and to the west are the Schwatka Mountains. The Endicott Mountains are separated from the Philip Smith Mountains by the Middle Fork of the Koyukuk River, the Dalton Highway, and Atigun Pass. The Endicott Mountains are separated from the Schwatka Mountains by Walker Lake, the upper reaches of the West Fork of the Kobuk River (Kaluluktok Creek), Akabluak Pass, and the Noatak River. The Endicott Mountains are separated from the mountains north of the Schwatka by Lucky Six Creek, Gull Pass, Gull Creek, a portion of the Alatna River and the Killik River.

From south to north the Endicott Mountains present long, broad glaciated valleys with rounded hills between rising in the center of the range to steep tors and aretes. The northern slopes of the Endicotts are steeper and more heavily incised, before they give way to the Arctic Coastal Plain.

Peaks
Peaks in the Endicott Mountains include the Arrigetch Peaks, and highest to lowest:

as well as a number of unnamed peaks over 7000 ft.

Geology
Above the crystalline basement PreCambrian and Paleozoic sediments that have undergone partial metamorphosis . Above these are middle Cambrian sediments and the well documented Kanayuk Conglomerate. The Kanayuk Conglomerate began to be deposited in the Devonian and continued through into the Mississippian (early Carboniferous).

Notes

Further reading
Handschy, James William (1989) Sedimentology and structural geology of the Endicott Mountains allochthon, central Brooks Range, Alaska PhD Thesis, Rice University, Abstract

External links
 "Endicott Mountains" from Peakbagger.com

Brooks Range
Gates of the Arctic National Park and Preserve
Landforms of Yukon–Koyukuk Census Area, Alaska
Mountains of Northwest Arctic Borough, Alaska
Mountains of Unorganized Borough, Alaska